Thyris usitata is a moth of the family Thyrididae. It is found in Russia and Japan.

Subspecies
Thyris usitata siberica (South Siberian Mountains)
Thyris usitata usitata (Sakhalin)
Thyris usitata ussuriensis (Amur and Primorye Region)

External links
  A Brief Account Of The Thyrididae(Lepidoptera) Of The Russian Far East

Thyrididae
Moths of Japan